Frances Jill McIvor  (née Anderson; born 10 August 1930 - 8 January 2019) was a Northern Irish barrister who was the first woman to serve as Northern Ireland Ombudsman and Commissioner for Complaints (1991–93).

In 1953 McIvor married the Ulster Unionist politician Basil McIvor; they had two sons and a daughter Jane.  She was widowed in 2004.

A barrister by profession, she has served in a variety of bodies including:
Independent Broadcasting Authority,
Radio Authority,
Fair Employment Commission,
Board of Cooperation North,
Board of Visitors of QUB (Member), and
Ulster-New Zealand Trust (Chairperson).

References

External links
 Larkin Society (QUB)
 Notice of McIvor's CBE
 QUB Board of Visitors appointment

1930 births
Ombudsmen in Northern Ireland
British barristers
Commanders of the Order of the British Empire
People associated with Queen's University Belfast
Women in the politics of Northern Ireland
Place of birth missing
2019 deaths